Molière Award for Best Actress.

Superlatives

Winners and nominees
 1987 : Suzanne Flon in Léopold le bien aimé
 Nicole Garcia in Two for the Seesaw  (Deux sur la balançoire)
 Denise Grey in Harold and Maude  (Harold et Maude)
 Jeanne Moreau in Zerline's Tale  (Le Récit de la servante Zerline)
 Dominique Valadié in Hedda Gabler
 1988 : Jeanne Moreau in Zerline's Tale  (Le récit de la servante Zerline)
 María Casares in Hecuba  (Hécube)
 Anny Duperey in The Secret  (Le Secret)
 Macha Méril in L'Éloignement
 Delphine Seyrig in Woman in Mind  (Un jardin en désordre)
 1989 : María Casares in Hecuba  (Hécube)
 Suzanne Flon in Une absence
 Denise Gence in The Chairs  (Les Chaises)
 Catherine Hiegel in La Veillée
 Isabelle Huppert in A Month in the Country  (Un mois à la campagne)
 1990 : Denise Gence in Avant la retraite
 Jane Birkin in Quelque part dans cette vie
 Anny Duperey in Le Pain de ménage et Le Plaisir de rompre
 Danièle Lebrun in Faut pas tuer maman !
 Sonia Vollereaux in Les Palmes de Monsieur Schutz
 1991 : Dominique Valadié in The Girl from Maxim's  (La Dame de chez Maxim)
 Marie-Anne Chazel in The Girl from Maxim's  (La Dame de chez Maxim)
 Tsilla Chelton in Driving Miss Daisy  (En conduisant Miss Daisy)
 Nicole Garcia in The Break of Noon  (Partage de midi)
 Annie Girardot in Heldenplatz
 Sophie Marceau in Eurydice
 1992 : Ludmila Mikaël in Célimène et le Cardinal
 Béatrice Agenin in C'était bien
 Suzanne Flon in L'Antichambre
 Anouk Grinberg in Time and the Room  (Le Temps et la chambre)
 Zabou in Cuisine et dépendances
1993 : Edwige Feuillère in Edwige Feuillère en scène
 Fanny Ardant in The Little Black Book (L'Aide mémoire)
 Emmanuelle Béart in On ne badine pas avec l'amour
 Denise Gence in Happy Days  (Oh les beaux jours)
 Catherine Hiegel in La Serva amorosa
 Sophie Marceau in Pygmalion
 1994 : Tsilla Chelton in The Chairs  (Les Chaises)
 Isabelle Huppert in Orlando
 Danièle Lebrun in La fille à la trompette
 Coline Serreau in Quisaitout et Grobêta
 Caroline Sihol in Je m'appelais Marie-Antoinette
 1995 : Suzanne Flon in La Chambre d’amis
 Juliette Brac in Charcuterie fine
 Geneviève Casile in L'Allée du roi
 Isabelle Huppert in Orlando
 Dominique Valadié in Espions et célibataires
 1996 : Christiane Cohendy in Decadence
 Anny Duperey in An Ideal Husband  (Un mari idéal)
 Nicole Garcia in Scènes de la vie conjugale
 Ludmila Mikael in Gertrud
 Geneviève Page in Mademoiselle Colombe  (Colombe)
 1997 : Myriam Boyer in Who's Afraid of Virginia Woolf?  (Qui a peur de Virginia Woolf ?)
 Fanny Ardant in Master Class
 Tsilla Chelton in Le Mal de mère
 Sandrine Kiberlain in Le Roman de Lulu
 Danièle Lebrun in Célimène et le Cardinal
 1998 : Dominique Blanc in A Doll's House  (Une maison de poupée)
 Béatrice Agenin in Who's Afraid of Virginia Woolf?  (Qui a peur de Virginia Woolf ?)
 Geneviève Fontanel in Adam et Eve
 Ludmila Mikael in Two for the Seesaw  (Deux sur la balançoire)
 Zabou in Skylight
 1999 : Isabelle Carré in Mademoiselle Else
 Annick Blancheteau in Pour la galerie
 Caroline Cellier in A Streetcar Named Desire  (Un tramway nommé désir)
 Marilu Marini in Le Frigo and La Femme assise
 Cristiana Reali in Duet for One  (Duo pour violon seul)
 2000 : Judith Magre inc Shirley
 Marianne Basler in Betrayal (Trahisons)
 Suzanne Flon in L'Amante anglaise
 Catherine Frot in Dîner entre amis
 Marie Laforêt in Master Class
 2001 : Corinne Jaber in A Beast on the Moon (Une bête sur la lune)
 Isabelle Adjani in The Lady of the Camellias  (La Dame aux camélias)
 Isabelle Huppert in Medea  (Médée)
 Ludmila Mikael in Un trait de l'esprit
 Catherine Rich in The Unexpected Man  (L'Homme du hasard)
 2002 : Annie Girardot in Madame Marguerite
 Clémentine Célarié in Madame Sans-Gêne
 Florence Pernel in The Shop Around the Corner  (La boutique au coin de la rue)
 Muriel Robin in La Griffe (A71)
 Caroline Sihol in Elvire
 2003 : Danielle Darrieux in Oscar and the Lady in Pink  (Oscar et la dame rose)
 Francine Bergé in Jeux de scène
 Dominique Blanc in Phèdre
 Anouk Grinberg in Proof  (La Preuve)
 Danièle Lebrun in Jeux de scène
 2004 : Isabelle Carré in L'Hiver sous la table
 Micheline Dax in Driving Miss Daisy  (Miss Daisy et son chauffeur)
 Isabelle Gelinas in Things We Do for Love  (L'Amour est enfant de salaud)
 Chantal Neuwirth in Portrait de famille
 Catherine Rich in Senator Fox  (Le Sénateur Fox)
 2005 : Christine Murillo in Dis à ma fille que je pars en voyage
 Myriam Boyer in Je viens d'un pays de neige
 Marianne Epin in Hannah K.
 Isabelle Huppert in Hedda Gabler
 Cristiana Reali in The Mistress of the Inn  (La Locandiera)
 Caroline Silhol in Molly
 2006 : Judith Magre in Histoires d'hommes
 Emmanuelle Devos in Créanciers
 Anny Duperey in Oscar and the Lady in Pink  (Oscar et la dame rose)
 Catherine Hiegel in Embrasser les ombres
 Catherine Samie in Happy Days  (Oh les beaux jours)
 Barbara Schulz in Pygmalion
 2007 : Martine Chevallier in Return to the Desert  (Le Retour au désert)
 Isabelle Adjani in Marie Stuart
 Geneviève Casile in Lady Windermere's Fan  (L'Éventail de Lady Windermere)
 Catherine Frot in Si tu mourais...
 Isabelle Gelinas in Le Jardin
 2008 : Myriam Boyer in The Life Before Us  (La Vie devant soi)
 Marina Hands in The Break of Noon  (Partage de midi)
 Cristiana Reali in Good Canary
 Dominique Reymond in 
 2009 : Anne Alvaro in Gertrude (The Cry)  (Gertrude (le cri))
 Zabou Breitman in Des gens
 Marie Laforêt in Master Class
 Christine Murillo in Vers toi terre promise
 Dominique Reymond in The Night of the Iguana  (La Nuit de l'iguane)
 Mélanie Thierry in Baby Doll
 2010 : Dominique Blanc in La Douleur
 Anny Duperey in Mademoiselle Colombe (Colombe)
 Isabelle Gélinas in L’Illusion conjugale
 Anouk Grinberg in Les Fausses Confidences
 Norah Krief in The Girl from Maxim's (La Dame de chez Maxim)
 Hélène Vincent in Alexandra David-Néel, mon Tibet
 2011 : Catherine Hiegel in La Mère
 Valeria Bruni Tedeschi in Autumn Dream (Rêve d'automne)
 Julie Depardieu in Nono
 Maaïke Jansen in Le Technicien
 Dominique Reymond in The Chairs (Les Chaises)
 Hélène Vincent in La Celestina (La Célestine)

Molière for an actress in a public theatre show
 2014 : Valérie Dréville in Ghosts (Les Revenants)
 Cécile Garcia-Fogel in Les Serments indiscrets
 Anouk Grinberg in Molly Bloom
 Isabelle Huppert in Les Fausses Confidences
Molière for an actress in a private theatre show
 2014 : Isabelle Gélinas in Le Père
 Emmanuelle Devos in La Porte à côté
 Agnès Jaoui in Les Uns sur les autres
 Valérie Lemercier in Un temps de chien

 2015 : Emmanuelle Devos in Platonov (Platonov)
 Audrey Bonnet in Répétition
 Émilie Incerti Formentini in Rendez‐vous Gare de l'Est
 Vanessa van Durme in Avant que j'oublie
 2015 : Marie Gillain in Venus in Fur (La Vénus à la fourrure)
 Myriam Boyer in Chère Elena
 Fanny Cottençon in On ne se mentira jamais !
 Miou-Miou in Des gens bien

 2016 : Dominique Blanc in Les Liaisons Dangereuses
 Catherine Hiegel in Le Retour au désert
 Francine Bergé in Bettencourt boulevard ou Une histoire de France
 Isabelle Huppert in Phèdre(s)
 2016 : Catherine Frot in Fleur de cactus
 Dominique Valadié in Who's Afraid of Virginia Woolf? (Qui a peur de Virginia Woolf?)
 Léa Drucker in Un amour qui ne finit pas
 Muriel Robin in Momo

 2017 :  in Les Damnés' Romane Bohringer in Les Liaisons Dangereuses
 Isabelle Carré in Honneur à notre élue
  in Children of a Lesser God
 2017 :  in Ensemble'' Béatrice Agenin in La Louve Clémentine Célarié in Darius Cristiana Reali in M'man''

External links
 Official website 

French theatre awards
French awards
Molière
Awards for actresses